National Taxi Workers' Alliance (NTWA) is a United States labor union that was founded in February 1998 by organizers in New York City, as the New York Taxi Workers' Alliance. On August 3, 2011, the NTWA made history when it became the 57th affiliate of the AFL–CIO. NTWA is the first non-traditional workforce made up of independent contractors who don't work for an hourly wage to be granted membership into the AFL–CIO, the oldest labor federation in the country. The Executive Council of the AFL–CIO voted unanimously "to include the NTWA into the house of labor with a national unionize taxi drivers throughout the United States". The union is made up of 200,000 taxi workers operating 100,000 vehicles serving 1 billion riders per year.

Origins of the union 
The National Taxi Workers' Alliance emerged from the organizing efforts of the founding member, Bhairavi Desai. Desai founded the NTWA four years after graduating from Rutgers University.

In May 1998 Desai organized the first taxi workers strike to occur in New York City in 30 years. Over 90 percent of the taxi drivers joined the strike with a demonstration of 2,000 yellow cabs lined up at 14th Street and Avenue D. Forty thousand drivers parked their taxis and refused to work to protest the city policing of their industry. In February 1998, Desai and other organizers founded the New York Taxi Workers' Alliance.

During the 2013 AFL–CIO Convention, Bhairavi Desai, the Executive Director of the Alliance was elected to the AFL–CIO Executive Council.

Chapters 
The National Taxi Workers' Alliance has active chapters in Philadelphia, Pennsylvania, New York City, New York, and San Francisco, California. The National describes its role as helping to "embolden the local chapters". The national officers work to strategize on key campaigns and organizing drives with the local chapters. The national chapter works to secure resources to help with membership recruitment, dues development, and institution-building.

The National Taxi Workers' Alliance's most active chapter remains the one in New York. Over 15,000 taxi cab drivers are currently members of the NYC Chapter. More than 90 percent of NYC's cab drivers are immigrants, belonging mostly to the South Asian diaspora from countries such as Bangladesh, Pakistan, and India.

Long-term goals 
Currently the National Taxi Workers' Alliance does not have any collective bargaining rights as they represent a non-traditional workforce. Taxi cab drivers are not covered under the Fair Labor Standards Act which protects workers' safety and grants overtime pay. Desai and other organizers are hopeful that the recent affiliation with AFL–CIO will help NTWA build a mass base of workers that can build their political influence and resources in order to one day win collective bargaining rights.

References

External links 
 New York Taxi Workers' Alliance materials in the South Asian American Digital Archive (SAADA)
 Bhairavi Desai materials in the South Asian American Digital Archive (SAADA)
 New York Taxi Workers Alliance Records at the Tamiment Library & Robert F. Wagner Labor Archives, New York University

AFL–CIO
Trade unions established in 1998
Transportation trade unions in the United States
Taxi drivers